MMO Games Magazine (formerly Massive Magazine) was a short-lived computer magazine that focused on the massively multiplayer online gaming market. It was published by the media conglomerate theGlobe.com as a sister publication to Computer Games magazine. The magazine's website was launched in June 2006, and the first issue hit newsstands that September. In January 2007 the magazine began to be published quarterly. Despite the build-up, only three issues went to press. In March 2007, theGlobe.com was forced to cease operation of its print media, including MMO Games, as a result of an unfavorable ruling in a spam lawsuit.

References

Video game magazines published in the United States
Defunct computer magazines published in the United States
Game magazines
Magazines established in 2006
Magazines disestablished in 2007
Quarterly magazines published in the United States